The Myxococcota are a phylum of bacteria known as the fruiting gliding bacteria. All species of this group are Gram-negative. They are predominantly aerobic genera that release myxospores in unfavorable environments.

Phylogeny
The currently accepted taxonomy is based on the List of Prokaryotic names with Standing in Nomenclature (LSPN) and the National Center for Biotechnology Information (NCBI).

See also
 List of bacterial orders
 List of bacteria genera
 Bacterial taxonomy

References

External links